The 12th Peacekeeping Brigade is a military unit of the Armed Forces of Armenia. Sometimes referred to as the Blue Berets due to its role (and its similarities to the Armenian Airborne Forces), it solely specializes in peacekeeping in foreign countries as part of international initiatives. It is commanded by Major General Artak Tonoyan. In early 2016, Defence Minister Seyran Ohanyan said that he considers the brigade to be the "basis for the establishment of a professional army".

History
In July 2001, a memorandum on Armenian peacekeeping was signed at the Headquarters of the United Nations in New York, being the catalyst for the formation of a peacekeeping unit. Captain Artak Tonoyan was appointed the first commander of the battalion. The battalion was subsequently reformed into a brigade. In February 2004, the first group of Armenian peacekeepers (consisting of 34 soldiers under the command of Lieutenant Artem Avdalyan) were deployed to Kosovo for six months.

In March 2008, the brigade was relocated to the former base of the Capital Regiment. In 2016, its personnel carried the flags of the United States, Germany, Italy, Poland and Greece while taking part in the Independence Day parade on Republic Square. In November 2017, the unit opened a peacekeeping training center (known as the Zar Peacekeeping Area) in Zar. A women's platoon was established that same year as part of the cooperation program between the unit and the United Nations Population Fund.

Participation in the Armenian Revolution
In April 2018, it was reported that members of the brigade marched alongside antigovernmental forces in the 2018 Armenian revolution. The Armenian Defense Ministry condemned what it described as an illegal action, saying that "The harshest legal measures will be taken against the soldiers".

Deployments

The Armenian army has collaborated in several international missions with the West. The first peacekeeping mission of the unit was in Kosovo, carried out as part of the Greek contingent in the town of Ferizaj.  On February 12, 2004, Armenia deployed a platoon-sized unit (three squads) to Kosovo as a part of the mission. It was headquartered in Camp "REGAS FEREOS" as a part of the Multi-National Task Force East and is tasked with maintaining vehicle check points, providing security for the base but also serves as a quick reaction force and crowd and riot control. In 2008, the KFOR unit was expanded, adding a second platoon plus company staff (bringing Armenia's contingent to about 85 personnel). It left Kosovo in 2011 only to return in 2012, with its new garrison being stationed at a base of United States Army Europe.

Other deployments

Iraq 
In January 2005, having received the consent of the National Assembly of Armenia, a group of 45 peacekeepers went to Iraq together with a Polish Army unit. The contingent consisted of sappers, engineers and doctors as part of the Multi-National Force – Iraq. On November 10, 2006, Senior Lieutenant Georgy Nalbandyan was injured in a mine explosion in Iraq but survived after being transported for surgery to a hospital in Landstuhl, Germany, near Ramstein Air Base. On October 6, 2008, due to improving security conditions, the contingent's tour of duty came to an end.

Afghanistan 
In July 2009, the Defense Minister of Armenia, Seyran Ohanyan, announced that Armenia would send a force from the brigade to participate with the International Security Assistance Force (ISAF) in the War in Afghanistan by the end of the year. He did not mention how large the force would be but did note that it probably would include munitions experts and communications officers. A MOD spokesmen also stated that the force would include medical specialists and translators as well. Ohanyan added that Armenian officers who served in the Soviet military during the Soviet–Afghan War also expressed the desire to return there as members of the new force. In November 2009, a NATO official affirmed that an Armenian contingent numbering 30 troops will join the ISAF sometime in early 2010. That number was revised to 40 in early December, when the Armenian parliament overwhelmingly voted in approval of the contingent's deployment. The servicemen arrived in Afghanistan in February 2010, where they carried out a mission jointly with the German Bundeswehr, being tasked to defend the regional airport in Kunduz. They also served in Kabul and Mazar-e-Sharif. There are currently 126 servicemen in Afghanistan.

Lebanon 
During the mission, an Armenian chapel was opened. Since December 2014, the brigade sent a platoon in Lebanon as part of the United Nations Interim Force in Lebanon.

Syria 
The brigade became the base of the Armenian contingent in Syria, a task force consisting of 83 medics, demining experts, force protection and other military personnel. This was the first independent foreign deployment of the Armenian military.

Kazakhstan 

100 peacekeepers were deployed to Kazakhstan in the aftermath of the 2022 Kazakh protests, serving to protect water sources and a bread factory in Almaty.

Commanders
Major General Arthur Simonyan (–12 October 2017)
Colonel Vaghinak Sargsyan (12 October 2017 – 20 June 2018)
Major General Artak Tonoyan (since 20 June 2018)

During the 2020 Nagorno-Karabakh war, it was reported by the Azerbaijani Army that Tonoyan was killed in action, although these reported were later deemed as false.

See also
Azerbaijani peacekeeping forces
KAZBAT
22nd Peacekeeping Battalion (Moldova)
Polish–Ukrainian Peace Force Battalion

References

Army units and formations of Armenia
Military units and formations established in 2001
2001 establishments in Armenia
Peacekeeping